Ronghua Subdistrict is a subdistrict located on the north of Daxing District, Beijing, China. It is within and under the administration of Beijing Economic-Technological Development Area. Ronghua borders Shibalidian Township and an exclave of Yizhuang Town to the north, Taihu and Majuqiao Towns to the east, Boxing Subdistrict to the south, and Yizhuang Town to the west. The name Ronghua literally translates to "Glory".

Administrative divisions 

As of 2021, Ronghua Subdistrict administers 8 residential communities. They are listed as follows:

Gallery

See also 

 List of township-level divisions of Beijing

References 

Daxing District
Subdistricts of Beijing